Bogdana Karadocheva (Bulgarian Cyrillic: Богдана Карадочева), (born July 19, 1949), is a Bulgarian estrade singer.

Karadocheva has been active in the musical sphere since the age of 14, receiving encouragement from her mother to turn to opera singing, though she expressed a preference for estrade music.

She received a prize at the "Golden Orphey" (Bulgarian: Златния Орфей) festival in 1969. Karadocheva is married to composer Stefan Dimitrov. Some of her most notable songs include "Дано", "Остаряваме бавно", "Иване, Иване", "Помниш ли ти" and "Нова година". Karadocheva was a recipient of "the most Bulgarian singer" award for 1998, being honoured by the Association for Bulgarian Spirituality (Bulgarian: Сдружение за българска духовност).

References 

1949 births
Living people
20th-century Bulgarian women singers
Bulgarian pop singers
Musicians from Sofia
Bulgarian pop musicians